Zachria is a genus of Australian huntsman spiders that was first described by Ludwig Carl Christian Koch in 1875.  it contains two species, found in New South Wales and Western Australia: Z. flavicoma and Z. oblonga. It is not a senior synonym of Eodelena.

See also
 List of Sparassidae species

References

Araneomorphae genera
Sparassidae
Spiders of Australia
Taxa named by Ludwig Carl Christian Koch